Orlov is a lunar impact crater. It is located on the Moon's far side, to the northeast of the larger crater Leeuwenhoek. To the north-northwest of Orlov is De Vries, and to the east-southeast is Rumford.

This crater lies between two larger satellite craters. Orlov Y is attached to the northern rim, and Leeuwenhoek E is connected along the southwest. The latter is also the location of an outward bulge in the rim of Orlov, giving it a wider interior wall along that side. There is some terracing along the eastern inner wall of Orlov. Orlov D, an oval-shaped crater, is attached to the outer rim along the northeast.

The interior floor of Orlov is relatively level with a central ridge formation located near the midpoint. There are some small craters along the extended inner wall to the southwest.

Satellite craters
By convention these features are identified on lunar maps by placing the letter on the side of the crater midpoint that is closest to Orlov.

References

 
 
 
 
 
 
 
 
 
 
 
 

Impact craters on the Moon